Sijua is a genus of moths of the family Thyrididae from Africa.

Type species: Sijua parvula  Whalley, 1971

Species
Some species of this genus are:

Sijua canitia 	Whalley, 1971
Sijua flavula 	(Pagenstecher, 1892)
Sijua furcatula 	(Pagenstecher, 1892)
Sijua jejunalis 	(Gaede, 1917)
Sijua latizonalis (Hampson, 1897)
Sijua meriani 	(Gaede, 1917)
Sijua neolatizona Whalley, 1971
Sijua parvula 	Whalley, 1971
Sijua plagalis 	(Gaede, 1917)
Sijua sigillata 	(Warren, 1898)

References

Whalley, 1971. The Thyrididae (Lepidoptera) of Africa and its islands. A taxonomic and zoogeographic study. - Bulletin of the British Museum of natural History (Entomology) Suppl. 17:1–198, pls. 1–68

Thyrididae
Moth genera